Mîndîc, also spelled Mândâc, is a village in Drochia District, Moldova. At the 2004 census, the commune had 3,402 inhabitants.

Notable people
 Ion Moraru

References

Villages of Drochia District